Mount Bubier is a mountain visible from seaward, its summit about  south of the northern tip of Edwards Peninsula on Thurston Island. It was first delineated from air photos taken by U.S. Navy Operation Highjump in December 1946, and named by the Advisory Committee on Antarctic Names for Kennard F. Bubier, an aviation mechanic on the Byrd Antarctic Expedition in 1928–30.

See also
 Mountains in Antarctica

Maps
 Thurston Island – Jones Mountains. 1:500000 Antarctica Sketch Map. US Geological Survey, 1967.
 Antarctic Digital Database (ADD). Scale 1:250000 topographic map of Antarctica. Scientific Committee on Antarctic Research (SCAR), 1993–2016.

References 

Mountains of Ellsworth Land
Thurston Island